Pampas Stadium is the provisional name of the new football stadium currently under construction in the Pampas neighbourhood, in the district of Retfala, Osijek, Croatia. The stadium will be the permanent home of SuperSport HNL side NK Osijek, replacing its current home, the Gradski Vrt Stadium. It is set to be completed till the beginning of spring 2023  and will have a capacity of 13,005. The precinct will also act as the training base of NK Osijek, with seven football pitches adjoining the stadium. The stadium will have a roof covering all of the seats and be in close proximity to the pitch. It will be located alongside the Drava river. The cost is estimated at €60 million, financed by NK Osijek with a grant from the Hungarian Government.

Construction 

The project was officially announced on 19 April 2018, in the famous Osijek movie theater "Urania", by the former president of the club Ivan Meštrović. 

Early enabling works on the site began in late 2017, when vegetating clearing was carried out. The plot was raised by 1.5 meter through additional landfill. With the site spanning 15.3 hectares, this represented thousands of truckloads. In April 2019, within a month, 1,000 piles (each 12 meters deep) were inserted into the ground, ensuring future stability of the stadium. 

In November 2019, the most famous NK Osijek player and former Croatian Football Federation president Davor Šuker announced a symbolic €1 million contribution from the federation to the project.

Specifications 
The size of the precinct will be 15.3 hectares. There will be 750 parking spaces available to the public and 150 VIP parking spaces. It will be a Category 4 UEFA stadium. 

Boxes in the West Stand will include beds, saunas, and Jacuzzis, whilst the adjoining camp will have a hotel, seven heated pitches and entertainment facilities for players. The stadium will have a capacity of 13,005 which will be able to be extended to 14,750 and will be the first all-covered stadium in the country. Roughly 550 seats would be of higher standard, of which 100 spread across 7 skyboxes. The roof (188x150m) will stretch outside the stadium, ensuring shade or rain protection and making it a more friendly public area. Hovering 22.5 meters above ground, it will be the landmark element. The stadium's facade will be translucent, ensuring sufficient sunlight access by day to facilities beneath the stands. Divided into 12 horizontal rings, the facade would be illuminated in varying colours, making the stadium attractive by night.

At the beginning of 2022, the club representatives announced that the West Stand won't feature saunas and jacuzzis, as originally planned. Instead, the initially planned area has been reduced and will be used as a hotel and training area for players. Also, due to the reduction of the mentioned area, the total capacity of the stadium rose from 12,750 to 13,005.

Construction progress gallery

Panorama

References 

Football venues in Croatia
Sports venues in Osijek
Stadiums under construction